Andrii Vyacheslavovych Ponomar (born 5 September 2002) is a Ukrainian cyclist, who currently rides for UCI WorldTeam .

Career
In May 2021, he was named in the startlist for the 2021 Giro d'Italia, he is the youngest rider to compete since 1929. Ponomar won his first professional race in 2021, the Ukrainian national road race championship.

Major results

2018
 3rd Time trial, National Junior Road Championships
2019
 National Junior Road Championships
1st  Time trial
1st  Road race
 UEC European Junior Road Championships
1st  Road race
8th Time trial
 1st Stage 3 Trophée Centre Morbihan
 4th Overall La Coupe du President de la Ville de Grudziądz
 5th Overall LVM Saarland Trofeo
1st Stage 2
 6th Overall Course de la Paix Juniors
2020
 1st  Overall Grand Prix Rüebliland
1st Stage 1
2021
 1st  Road race, National Road Championships
 1st  Young rider classification, Belgrade–Banja Luka
2022
 10th Giro della Toscana

Grand Tour general classification results timeline

References

External links

2002 births
Living people
Sportspeople from Chernihiv
Ukrainian male cyclists
21st-century Ukrainian people